Airth Old Parish Church is a ruined church which stands within the grounds of Airth Castle at Airth, in the Falkirk council area in Scotland.

The building is now roofless.  It dates from various periods, with substantial parts from the Romanesque period, and quire steeple and north aisle added by John Milne the royal master mason in 1647. Access to the kirk is restricted for safety reasons. The graveyard includes a number of cast iron ‘mortsafes’, large coffin shaped containers used to thwart the plans of the body snatchers in the early 19th century.

The church is designated as a scheduled monument by Historic Environment Scotland.

References

External links 
 Transcript of a contract for building work at Airth Old Parish Church, July 1647.

Scheduled Ancient Monuments in Falkirk
Church ruins in Scotland